Max Hicks (born 15 September 1999) is a New Zealand rugby union player who plays for  in the Bunnings NPC and the  in Super Rugby. His position is lock.

Career 
Hicks plays his club rugby for Marist in Tāhunanui. He was named in the Tasman Mako squad for the 2021 Bunnings NPC. Hicks made his debut for Tasman in Round 3 of the competition against , coming off the bench in a 29-48 win for the Mako. He was named in the  squad for the 2022 Super Rugby Pacific season. Hicks made his debut for the Highlanders in Round 8 of the 2022 season, coming off the bench against Moana Pasifika in a 37–17 win for the Highlanders. Hicks was named as a late replacement in the Māori All Blacks squad to play Ireland in late June early July 2022.

References

External links
itsrugby.co.uk profile

New Zealand rugby union players
Living people
Rugby union locks
Tasman rugby union players
Highlanders (rugby union) players
Rugby union flankers
1999 births